Fairlie Harmar, Viscountess Harberton (1876–1945) was an English painter. She was born in Weymouth, Dorset, and studied at the Slade School of Fine Art. Lady Harberton was married to Ernest Pomeroy, 7th Viscount Harberton.

Whilst reviewing Lady Harberton's work in 1918, Ezra Pound thought she was a man, writing "Mr. F. Harmer [sic] has put good work into it".

References

External links
 

1876 births
1945 deaths
19th-century English women artists
19th-century English painters
20th-century English women artists
20th-century English painters
Alumni of the Slade School of Fine Art
Burials at Kensal Green Cemetery
English women painters
Harberton
People from Weymouth, Dorset